Espeyli (also Romanized as Espeylī; also known as Esbeylī, Esopeylī, Isbaili, and Isbayli) is a village in Deylaman Rural District, Deylaman District, Siahkal County, Gilan Province, Iran. At the 2006 census, its population was 347, in 96 families.

References 

Populated places in Siahkal County